3 lane road may refer to:

A 3 lane road where the center lane is a reversible lane
2+1 road